Wacken is a municipality near the town of  Itzehoe in Schleswig-Holstein, Germany. Wacken was first mentioned in 1148, but there were probably some settlements before, which is proven by the trove of Germanic artefacts.

Today, Wacken is famous for annually staging the world's biggest open air heavy metal festival, "Wacken Open Air", which has hosted popular metal acts such as Iron Maiden, Scorpions, Saxon, Alice Cooper, Deep Purple, Mötley Crüe, Slayer, Rammstein, Motörhead and Judas Priest, as well as local and perennial regulars, including Subway to Sally and Wacken's Firefighters' band. Every citizen gets free entry to the festival.

The primary economic driver of the village is farming, followed by the Wacken Open Air (W:O:A) festival. In 2007, the village made about 7,000 € per capita in profit from catering, merchandising and other support services at Wacken Open Air.

The festival is held in July and August, a period which often has stormy weather in that area. Wacken is infamous for its unpredictable and rapid changing weather conditions during the festival. Sun blocker as well as rubber boots are appropriate. Temperatures from +8 to +40 °C might be expected. During a longer rain period the festival venue gets really muddy and the green of the meadows vanishes in festival infields.

Two weeks before each and a week during festival the entire village turns into huge construction or restrained area. Many venues get caged and streets are restricted.

In recent years about up to 25,000 tourists went every day to the village during festival without tickets.

Due to the festival the entry sign to the village is frequently a victim of road sign theft.

References

External links 

 The town's official website

Steinburg